Adriaan Ludick (born ) is a Namibian rugby union player for South African side the  in the Currie Cup and the Rugby Challenge. His regular position is lock.

References

Namibian rugby union players
Living people
1998 births
Rugby union locks
Boland Cavaliers players
Namibia international rugby union players